Pimplinae are a  worldwide subfamily of the parasitic wasp family Ichneumonidae.

Pimplinae are parasitoids of Endopterygota, often the pupae of Lepidoptera. Various species parasitize the egg sacs and adults of spiders. There are 95 genera.

Pimplinae are generally sturdy black insects with orange markings. The first tergite is  box-like with the spiracle anterior to the middle.

List of genera
Delomeristini Hellén, 1915

 Atractogaster Kriechbaumer, 1872
 Delomerista Förster, 1868

Ephialtini Hellén, 1915

 Acrodactyla Haliday, 1838
 Acropimpla Townes, 1960
 Acrotaphus Townes, 1960
 Afrephialtes Benoit, 1963
 Afrosphincta Benoit, 1953
 Alophosternum Cushman, 1933
 Anastelgis Townes, 1960
 Aravenator Momoi, 1973
 Calliephialtes Ashmead, 1900
 Camptotypus Kriechbaumer, 1889
 Clistopyga Gravenhorst, 1829
 Clydonium Townes, 1966
 Dolichomitus Smith, 1877
 Dreisbachia Townes, 1962
 Endromopoda Hellén, 1939
 Ephialtes Gravenhorst, 1829
 Eriostethus Morley, 1914
 Eruga Townes & Townes, 1960
 Exeristes Förster, 1869
 Exestuberis Wang & Yue, 1995
 Flacopimpla Gauld, 1991
 Flavopimpla Betrem, 1932
 Fredegunda Fitton, Shaw & Gauld, 1988
 Gregopimpla Momoi, 1965
 Hemipimpla Saussure, 1892
 Hymenoepimecis Viereck, 1912
 Iseropus Förster, 1868
 Leptopimpla Townes, 1961
 Liotryphon Ashmead, 1900
 Lithoserix Brown, 1986
 Odontopimpla Cameron, 1886
 Oxyrrhexis Förster, 1868
 Pachymelos Baltazar, 1961
 Paraperithous Haupt, 1954
 Parvipimpla Gauld, 1984
 Pimplaetus Seyrig, 1932
 Piogaster Perkins, 1958
 Polysphincta Gravenhorst, 1829
 Pseudopimpla Habermehl, 1917
 Pterinopus Townes, 1969
 Scambus Hartig, 1838
 Schizopyga Gravenhorst, 1829
 Sericopimpla Kriechbaumer, 1895
 Sinarachna Townes, 1960
 Ticapimpla Gauld, 1991
 Townesia Ozols, 1962
 Tromatobia Förster, 1869
 Umanella Gauld, 1991
 Xanthephialtes Cameron, 1906
 Xanthophenax Saussure, 1892
 Zabrachypus Cushman, 1920
 Zaglyptus Förster, 1869
 Zatypota Förster, 1869
 Zonopimpla Ashmead, 1900

Perithoini Wahl & Gauld, 1998

 Perithous Holmgren, 1859

Pimplini Wesmael, 1845

 Alophopimpla Momoi, 1966
 Apechthis Förster, 1868
 Augerella Gupta, 1962
 Echthromorpha Holmgren, 1868
 Epitheronia Gupta, 1962
 Itoplectis Förster, 1869
 Lissopimpla Kriechbaumer, 1889
 Neotheronia Krieger, 1899
 Nomosphecia Gupta, 1962
 †Parapimpla Théobald, 1937
 Parema Gupta, 1962
 Pimpla Fabricius, 1804
 Strongylopsis Brauns, 1896
 Theronia Holmgren, 1859
 Xanthopimpla Saussure, 1892

Gallery

References

External links
Diagnostic characters
Waspweb
Ponent Images (in easy Spanish)
Hymenoptera Online (HOL)

Taxonomicon

 
Apocrita subfamilies